Crescent Boat Club is an American amateur rowing club located at #5 Boathouse Row in the historic Boathouse Row of Philadelphia, Pennsylvania. It was founded in 1867 when Pickwick Barge Club and Iona Barge Club merged. Crescent Boat Club joined the Schuylkill Navy in 1868. In 1871, Crescent competed in and won the doubles event in the first regatta of the National Association of Amateur Oarsmen, an event "which undoubtedly helped the sport greatly."

Today, Crescent Boat Club continues to contribute to the rowing community and Schuylkill Navy. The club houses two rowing programs, Roman Catholic High School and Thomas Jefferson University during the scholastic seasons and its own novice, junior, and senior sculling programs as well as a private membership and social group.  The club is available for rent to host events, meetings, parties, celebrations and gatherings.

The boathouse
Between 1869 and 1871, Crescent erected a boathouse with Pennsylvania Barge Club. Today, the club's boathouse exhibits the work of renowned Philadelphia architect Charles Balderston. From 1890 to 1891, Crescent made alterations and additions, designed by Balderston, to the 1871 building. The boathouse was initially two stories of stone, but Balderston's design added the upper stories of half-timbered brick and stucco, which cap the building today.

After World War II
As a result of World War II, the club suffered a drastic reduction in membership. In 1951, Crescent turned the operation of its boathouse over to LaSalle Rowing Association. The club was known as LaSalle Rowing Association until 1960. By 1974, the boathouse was vacant. Under the leadership of John Wilkins, the house was later reoccupied by Crescent. In addition to hosting LaSalle's team, Crescent also hosted the St. Joseph's University women's team and the men's team from Roman Catholic High School. Crescent has the smallest membership of the clubs in the Schuylkill Navy.

Photo gallery

References

Further reading

External links
Crescent Boat Club on wikimapia.org

National Register of Historic Places in Philadelphia
National Historic Landmarks in Pennsylvania
Buildings and structures in Philadelphia
Cultural infrastructure completed in 1871
Victorian architecture in Pennsylvania
Boathouse Row
Schuylkill Navy
Sports clubs established in 1867
1867 establishments in Pennsylvania
Philadelphia Register of Historic Places
Historic district contributing properties in Pennsylvania
Boathouses on the National Register of Historic Places in Pennsylvania